Paulig is a Finnish family-owned food and drink company, founded in 1876. The company's brands are Paulig, Santa Maria, Risenta and Poco Loco. Paulig has 2,000 employees in 13 countries and its net sales in 2019 were EUR 921 million.

History 
The history of Paulig began in 1876, when German  established a new company in Helsinki. Paulig had arrived in Finland from Lübeck, Germany, in 1871.

Finland was undergoing big changes, which brought big opportunities in the business. Paulig imported salt, coffee, spices, flours, port wine and cognac.

During the first decades, Paulig's office was located in Helsinki. , Gustav's wife, took care of the company after Gustav died in 1907.

Gustav's and Bertha's son, Eduard Paulig, was the managing director of the company from 1919 to 1947. During the era of Eduard Paulig, the company developed into an important company in Finland.

In October 2011, Paulig introduced the Cupsolo capsule machine to the market, which can be used to prepare, among other things, Paulig's popular Juhla Mokka and Presidentti coffees, Tazza cocoa, tea and specialty coffees such as cappuccino and espresso.

In September 2016, Paulig acquired Gold & Green Foods to market meat alternative products.

Since 2018, the CEO and Managing Director has been Rolf Ladau.

International business 
When Baltic states declared their independence from Soviet Union in 1991, Paulig started to do co-operation with other old chambers of commerce. Paulig started business in Saue, Estonia in 1993.

Some products 
 Presidentti
 Juhla Mokka
 Brazil
 Paulig Mundo
 Paulig Espresso Originale
 Paulig Fortissimo
 Frezza (ice-cold milk coffee)

See also
 Robert's Coffee

References

External links
 

Companies based in Helsinki
Companies established in 1876
Finnish brands
Coffee brands
Food and drink companies of Finland
1876 establishments in Finland
Coffee in Europe
Agriculture companies of Finland